The 2018 Nagoya Grampus season was Nagoya Grampus' first season back in the J1 League following their relegation at the end of the 2016 season, their 25th J1 League season and 35th overall in the Japanese top flight. They also took part in the Emperor's Cup and the J. League Cup.

Squad

Out on loan

Transfers

In

Out

Loans in

Loans out

Released

Friendlies

Competitions

J. League

Results summary

Results by round

Results

League table

J. League Cup

Group stage

Emperor's Cup

Squad statistics

Appearances and goals

|-
|colspan="14"|Players away on loan:

|-
|colspan="14"|Players who left Nagoya Grampus during the season:

|}

Goal Scorers

Disciplinary record

References

Nagoya Grampus
Nagoya Grampus seasons